Amandine Brossier (born 15 August 1995 in Cholet) is a French sprinter specialising in the 400 metres. She won a bronze medal at the 2019 Summer Universiade. Her first Olympic Games was Tokyo 2020. Her highest world ranking position was 21 in the women's 400m race.

International competitions

Personal bests
Outdoor
200 metres – 23.33 (+2.0 m/s, Albi 2018)
400 metres – 51.77 (Naples 2019)
Indoor
200 metres – 23.44 (Liévin 2018)
400 metres – 52.77 (Miramas 2019)

References

1995 births
Living people
French female sprinters
People from Cholet
Mediterranean Games medalists in athletics
Universiade bronze medalists for France
Universiade medalists in athletics (track and field)
Medalists at the 2019 Summer Universiade
Mediterranean Games silver medalists for France
Athletes (track and field) at the 2018 Mediterranean Games
Athletes (track and field) at the 2020 Summer Olympics
Olympic female sprinters
Olympic athletes of France
Sportspeople from Maine-et-Loire